Kai Killerud is a Norwegian handball player.

He made his debut on the Norwegian national team in 1961, 
and played 33 matches for the national team between 1961 and 1971. He participated at the 1961 and 1970 World Men's Handball Championship.

References

Year of birth missing (living people)
Living people
Norwegian male handball players